Procambarus escambiensis, sometimes called the Escambia crayfish, is a species of crustacean in family Cambaridae. It is endemic to the Escambia River system in Alabama and Florida and is listed as an endangered species on the IUCN Red List.

References

Cambaridae
Crustaceans of the United States
Crustaceans described in 1942
Taxa named by Horton H. Hobbs Jr.
Freshwater crustaceans of North America
Taxonomy articles created by Polbot